The VH Platform (for vertical/horizontal platform) is Aston Martin's automobile platform that underpinned their grand tourers and sports cars. It served as the basis for Aston Martin's production cars up until the introduction of the Aston Martin DB11 in 2016, which featured an all-new bonded-aluminium platform that would underpin future Aston Martins. The VH platform was used in all of Aston Martin's lineup at the time excluding the One-77, which uses Carbon Architecture and the Cygnet which is based on the Toyota iQ. There are four variations of the VH platform.

Variants

Pre-VH Vanquish and VH Generation I
The original first-generation Aston Martin Vanquish used an advanced and complex chassis that predated the VH platform.  Featuring a carbon fiber central tunnel and A pillars along with an aluminum alloy space frame, experience building the V12 Vanquish would be applied to all future Aston Martins.  While the original V12 Vanquish is not considered to be a VH platform car, some consider it to be the "Ur-VH" platform vehicle as some elements of the Vanquish evolved into the VH architecture.

The first true VH Chassis was an aluminum intensive structure that made its debut in the Aston Martin DB9 in 2004, and has underpinned the DB9 through the course of its production run from 2004 to 2012. It was refined in 2008 for the 2009 model year DB9. The 2013 model year DB9 was underpinned by the Generation III platform (VH300), where it shared structural components and hardware technology from the Generation III architecture that was used in the 2011 Virage and the second-generation Vanquish (VH310) in 2012.

VH Generation II
The second VH platform underpinned the 2005 Aston Martin V8 Vantage and its V12 and S variants, as well as the Vantage V12 S based Zagato (VH290Z) and the bespoke Aston Martin DB10 concept car for the James Bond film Spectre. The DB10 was based on the V8 Vantage chassis albeit with modifications, as it featured a longer wheelbase and is nearly as wide as the Aston Martin One-77. This platform was also used in the 2007 DBS.

VH Generation III
The third VH platform underpinned the 2011 Virage and facelifted DB9 (VH300), Virage Volante and facelifted DB9 Volante (VH340), the Vanquish (VH310), the Vanquish S (VH320) and the Vanquish Volante/Vanquish S Volante (VH340). It was also used as the platform for the Vanquish Zagato (VH319Z), the Vanquish Zagato Volante (VH340Z), the Vanquish Zagato Speedster (VH3612ZS) and the Vanquish Zagato Roadster (VH3410Z).

VH Generation IV
Based on VH Generation III, Generation IV is a stretched and re-engineered Generation III platform used on the Rapide (VH410/VH410D) and its variants, and the Vanquish Zagato Shooting Brake (VH324ZB).

References

External links

VH
Vh platform